Nidal Nasser (born 27 February 1955) is a Syrian sports shooter. He competed in the mixed trap event at the 1980 Summer Olympics.

References

1955 births
Living people
Syrian male sport shooters
Olympic shooters of Syria
Shooters at the 1980 Summer Olympics
Place of birth missing (living people)